G. bidentata may refer to:

 Gnathifera bidentata, a fringe-tufted moth
 Gonomyia bidentata, a crane fly
 Gynoplistia bidentata, a crane fly